Alistair Hulett (15 October 1951 – 28 January 2010) was a Scottish acoustic folk singer best known as the singer of the folk punk band, Roaring Jack.

Early life
Born in Glasgow, Hulett discovered traditional music as an early teen and began playing the folk circuit in New Zealand in 1968, after immigrating with his family. By 1971, he relocated to Australia continuing to perform at festivals. In the early 1980s Hulett founded the folk punk five piece, Roaring Jack, and opened for international acts such as Billy Bragg, The Pogues and The Men They Couldn't Hang. The band was nominated for two ARIA Music Awards during their career.

Solo career
Hullett's first solo CD, Dance of the Underclass, was released in 1991 and was completely acoustic, featuring contributions from other members of Roaring Jack, and a rendition of The Internationale. "Dance of the Underclass" established Hulett as a key contemporary Australian writer, with several of the songs now regarded as modern Australian standards. One of the CD's songs He Fades Away, concerning the death of an Australian blue asbestos miner, was covered by Roy Bailey and June Tabor, and later by Andy Irvine. Both He Fades Away and Blue Murder were featured on the Niamh Parsons album Old Simplicity.

A second album, In The Back Streets of Paradise, was released in 1994, and was a collection of songs originally intended as the next Roaring Jack's release. This CD featured long-term collaborator, Jimmy Gregory, with whom Hulett played in a duo for many years on the Sydney folk circuit. The release of In The Back Streets of Paradise coincided with the formation of a new touring band Alistair Hulett and The Hooligans, featuring Lindsay Martin (fiddle), John Deery (uilleann pipes), Jimmy Gregory (Bouzouki), James Fagan (Bouzouki and clarinet) and Phil Murray (accordion).

Later music
In addition to his solo albums, Hulett worked with Dave Swarbrick of Fairport Convention, producing three albums, and towards the end of his life, formed a new band, The Malkies, with whom he released one album. He also sang on six songs on the Linn Records 12 CD Complete Songs of Robert Burns project.

Political beliefs
In 1991 while living in Australia, Hulett joined the International Socialist Organisation after becoming radicalised by the Gulf War. In 1995, Hulett co-founded the Australian Trotskyist organisation Socialist Alternative, while often playing political benefits and rallies with Roaring Jack.

Hulett wrote songs in support of Indigenous Australians, the Builders Labourers Federation, the Maritime Union of Australia, Scottish socialist John Maclean and Chilean singer-songwriter and political activist Victor Jara, and songs attacking Stalinism, Australian Imperialism, former Australian Labor Party Prime Ministers Bob Hawke and Ben Chifley, Postmodernists and Canadian singer-songwriter Leonard Cohen over his support for Israel.

After returning to his native Glasgow in the late 1990s, Alistair was, until his death, an active member of the Socialist Workers Party.

Illness and death
Hulett became acutely ill on New Year's Day 2010 and was hospitalised on 5 January with suspected food poisoning. Liver failure was later diagnosed and it was hoped that he could receive a liver transplant, but further investigation revealed a very aggressive metastatic cancer which had already spread to his lungs and stomach. Hulett died on 28 January 2010 at the Southern General Hospital in Glasgow, only days after the cancer was first detected.

He was survived by his second wife, Fatima Uygun, who issued the following statement on his official site to announce his death:

Dear Friends,

It is with overwhelming sadness I write to report the death of Alistair Hulett – singer, songwriter, international socialist, revolutionary, ecologist, community activist and my partner and best friend of 17 years.

Alistair died on Thursday evening, 28 January at 6:30pm at the Southern General Hospital in Glasgow. Many friends have been shocked by the severity and speed of his deterioration, none more so than myself.

Alistair became ill very suddenly on New Year's Day and was hospitalised on 5 January with suspected food poisoning. Liver failure was later diagnosed and it was hoped that he could receive a liver transplant, but further investigation revealed a very aggressive form of cancer which had already spread from his liver to his lungs and stomach. Alistair died peacefully only days after the cancer was first detected.

His funeral will be held at Linn Crematorium in Lainshaw Drive on Friday 5 Feb at 1:30pm, with a reception afterwards (venue for this will be advised once confirmed).

I would like to thank, with all my heart, the hundreds of people who wrote letters, sent emails, cards and left telephone messages of support during his short illness. They were a huge comfort to myself and his family.

A memorial will also be held in Sydney organised by his family and friends in the next couple of months.

Alistair was a kind, gentle man who was committed to fighting for a better world – a world based on the principles of justice, equality, love and respect for all of humanity. The world was a better place for knowing him and is a sadder place for his loss. He leaves a great legacy in his music that will continue to bring inspiration to many who, like him, believed a better world was possible.

Fatima

Album discography 

With Roaring Jack

Street Celtability 12" EP, 1987
Cat Among The Pigeons, 1988
Through The Smoke of Innocence, 1990
The Complete Works of Roaring Jack (German compilation), 2003

Solo

Dance of the Underclass, 1991
In The Back Streets of Paradise, 1994
In Sleepy Scotland, 2001
Riches And Rags, 2006

With Dave Swarbrick

Saturday Johnny and Jimmy The Rat, 1996
The Cold Grey Light of Dawn, 1998
Red Clydeside, 2002

With The Malkies

Suited and Booted, 2008

References

External links 
Official site
Alistair Hulett Biography
Alistair Hulett and Dave Swarbrick
 
Roaring Jack Tribute site
Selection of videos
The Malkies

1951 births
2010 deaths
Scottish folk singers
Scottish socialists
Deaths from cancer in Scotland
Scottish expatriates in Australia
Socialist Workers Party (UK) members